The 1966 Special Honours in New Zealand were two special honours lists, dated 4 March and 23 September 1966, in which a judge and a soldier were recognised.

Order of Saint Michael and Saint George

Companion (CMG)
 Herbert Richard Churton Wild  – Chief Justice of New Zealand.

Order of the British Empire

Member (MBE)
Military division
 Captain Graham Douglas Birch – of Waiouru; Royal Regiment of New Zealand Artillery (Regular Force). In recognition of his services during operations in Vietnam.

References

Special honours
1966 awards